The 1955 NCAA baseball tournament was played at the end of the 1955 NCAA baseball season to determine the national champion of college baseball.  The tournament concluded with eight teams competing in the College World Series, a double-elimination tournament in its ninth year.  Eight regional districts sent representatives to the College World Series with preliminary rounds within each district serving to determine each representative.  These events would later become known as regionals.  Each district had its own format for selecting teams, resulting in 25 teams participating in the tournament at the conclusion of their regular season, and in some cases, after a conference tournament.  The College World Series was held in Omaha, NE from June 10 to June 16.  The ninth tournament's champion was Wake Forest, coached by Taylor Sanford.  The Most Outstanding Player was Tom Borland of Oklahoma A&M.

Tournament

District 1
Games played at Springfield, Massachusetts.

District 2
Games played in Allentown, Pennsylvania.

District 3
District 3 consisted of two separate 3 game series.  The first series was played between Wake Forest and Rollins, with the winner moving on to play West Virginia in a three-game series.  The winner of that series moved on to the College World Series.

Games played at Morgantown, West Virginia.

District 4
District 4 consisted of two separate 3 game series.  The first series was played between Alma and Western Michigan, with the winner moving on to play Ohio State in a three-game series.  The winner of that series moved on to the College World Series.

Games played at Kalamazoo, Michigan.

District 5
Games played in Norman, Oklahoma.

District 6
Games played at Tucson, Arizona.

District 7
Games played at Greeley, Colorado.

District 8
District 8 consisted of two tiers of play.  The first tier was a four-team double-elimination tournament with the winner moving on to play Southern California in a three-game series.  The winner of that series moved onto the College World Series.

Games played at Fresno, California.

Games played at Los Angeles, California.

College World Series

Participants

Bracket and Results

Game results

Tournament Notes
 In 1996, coach Rod Dedeaux of USC was named to the College World Series All-Time Team (1947–95) by the Oklahoma World-Herald as part of the 50th CWS celebration.
 In 1996, Tom Borland of Oklahoma A&M, now known as Oklahoma State, was named to the 1940s-50s All-Decade Team by a panel of 60 voters representing CWS head coaches, media, and chairs of the Division I Baseball Committee.
 Freed Messner of Western Michigan hit the only pinch-hit grand slam home run in CWS history in the top of the 8th of Game 13 in a 10-7 loss to Wake Forest. It was also Messner's only hit of the CWS (1-12).
 Two-hitters were pitched by: Lawrence Bossidy of Colgate in a 1-0 loss to Wake Forest; Carl Thomas of Arizona in a 6-0 defeat of Springfield; Ken Kinnamon and Don Anderson of Oklahoma A&M in a 5-4 loss to Western Michigan; and Sam Frankel and Lawrence Bossidy of Colgate in a 4-2 loss to Oklahoma A&M.
 Wake Forest's championship was the last time that a member of the Atlantic Coast Conference won the CWS until the University of Virginia in 2015. 
 21,843 fans watched the CWS (10 sessions). 
 The championship game was umpired by Walter Doyle, Walter Harbour, George Hametz, and John Hergert.
 The following records were set or tied:
 Most Stolen Bases, Team, CWS - 17, Oklahoma A&M, 5 games
 Most Shutouts, All Teams, CWS - 6, Arizona (2), Wake Forest (3), Western Michigan, tied
 Most Doubles, Individual, Single Game - 3, Jack Bryant, 2B, Wake Forest, tied (6 others)
 Most Sacrifice Bunts, Individual, Single Game - 3, Leland Davis, SS, Western Michigan, tied
 Most Stolen Bases, Team, Single Game - 7, Wake Forest, tied (4 others)
 Fewest Assists, Team, Single Game - 3, Oklahoma A&M, tied (6 others)
 Most Errors, Team, Single Game - 9, Northern Colorado, tied
 Most Shutouts, Team, CWS - 3, Wake Forest, 6 games

Notes

References 

Tournament
NCAA Division I Baseball Championship
NCAA baseball tournament
NCAA baseball tournament
NCAA baseball tournament
NCAA baseball tournament
NCAA baseball tournament
NCAA baseball tournament
NCAA baseball tournament
NCAA baseball tournament
NCAA baseball tournament
NCAA baseball tournament
1955 in Los Angeles
20th century in Springfield, Massachusetts
Baseball in Allentown, Pennsylvania
Baseball competitions in California
Baseball competitions in Los Angeles
Baseball competitions in Arizona
Baseball competitions in Colorado
Baseball competitions in Massachusetts
Baseball competitions in Michigan
Baseball competitions in Omaha, Nebraska
Baseball competitions in Oklahoma
Baseball competitions in Pennsylvania
Baseball competitions in West Virginia
Sports competitions in Fresno, California
Sports competitions in Springfield, Massachusetts
Sports in Morgantown, West Virginia
Sports in Kalamazoo, Michigan
Sports in Tucson, Arizona
Greeley, Colorado
Norman, Oklahoma
Events in Tucson, Arizona